Lytle Creek is a stream in Clinton County, Ohio, in the United States.

Lytle Creek was named for Gen. William Lytle, of the Lytle family.

Location
Mouth: Confluence with Todd Fork, Clinton County at 
Source: East of Wilmington at

See also
List of rivers of Ohio

References

Rivers of Clinton County, Ohio
Rivers of Ohio